Bring Out a Briton was an Australian propaganda short film directed by Lee Robinson and presented by Chips Rafferty.

It was made by the Australian government to promote British emigration to Australia as part of the "Bring Out a Briton" campaign launched in 1957 by Athol Townley.

References

External links
Complete copy of film at NFSA YouTube Channel

Australian short documentary films
1950s English-language films